Mimesa is a genus of wasps belonging to the family Crabronidae.

The species of this genus are found in Europe and Northern America.

Species:
 Mimesa aegyptiaca Radoszkowski, 1876 
 Mimesa agalena Gittins, 1966

References

Crabronidae
Hymenoptera genera